Cross of the Living (La Croix des vivants) (L'amore impossibilie) is a 1962 French-Italian film. It stars Pascale Petit, Karlheinz Böhm and Gabriele Ferzetti.

Cast 
 Karlheinz Böhm - Gus
 Pascale Petit - Maria
 Giani Esposito - Yan
 Christine Darvel - Nell
 Alain Cuny - Baron Von Eggerth
 Madeleine Robinson - Mme Van Dorneck
 Gabriele Ferzetti - Abbe
 Roger Dumas - Sylvain
 Marika Green - Gretel

References

External links
 

1962 films
Italian thriller drama films
1960s Italian-language films
French thriller drama films
Belgian thriller drama films
1960s Italian films
1960s French films